Macroditassa is a genus of plant in family Apocynaceae, first described as a genus in 1927. It is native to South America.

Species

formerly included
transferred to Ditassa 
 Macroditassa violascens (Schltr.) Malme synonym of  Ditassa violascens Schltr..

References

Asclepiadoideae
Apocynaceae genera
Taxa named by Gustaf Oskar Andersson Malme